Seiichi Sodeyama (袖山誠一 - Sodeyama Seiichi; born March 23, 1950) is a Japanese professional racing driver.

Complete JGTC results 
(key)

References 

1950 births
Living people
Japanese racing drivers